7-Ketodehydroepiandrosterone (7-keto-DHEA,7-oxo-DHEA), also known as 7-oxoprasterone, is a prohormone produced by metabolism of the prohormone dehydroepiandrosterone (DHEA). 

7-oxo-DHEA is even more effective than DHEA for inducing heat production (thermogenesis). Because dieting is usually accompanied by reduced resting metabolic rate, obese persons may benefit from using 7-oxo-DHEA when dieting due to increased metabolic rate. 

7-Keto-DHEA is not directly converted to testosterone or estrogen, and has thus been investigated as a potentially more useful relative of DHEA. Researchers have raised concern that supplements may trigger positive tests for performance-enhancing drugs.

The World Anti-Doping Agency lists 7-keto-DHEA as a prohibited anabolic agent. The FDA has proposed that it be banned from use in compounded drugs.

Chemistry

7-Keto-DHEA has a number of chemical names, including:

 7-Ketodehydroepiandrosterone (7-keto-DHEA)
 7-Oxodehydroepiandrosterone (7-oxo-DHEA)
 7-Ketoprasterone
 7-Oxoprasterone
 3β-Hydroxyandrost-5-ene-7,17-dione
 Androst-5-en-3β-ol-7,17-dione

For the acetate ester:

 3β-Acetoxyandrost-5-ene-7,17-dione
 7-Oxo-dehydroepiandrosterone acetate (7-oxo-DHEA acetate)
 3-Acetyl-7-oxo-dehydroepiandrosterone (3-acetyl-7-oxo-DHEA)
 DHEA acetate-7-one
 Δ5-Androstene-3β-acetoxy-7,17-dione

Note: "Keto" can be substituted for "oxo" in the above names.

History
7-Keto-DHEA has been marketed by alternative medicine providers as a treatment of Adrenal fatigue, a pseudo-scientific term with no scientific basis.

Regulation
The FDA has proposed that 7-Keto-DHEA be included among substances banned from use in compounded drugs.

See also
 List of investigational anxiolytics
 7α-Hydroxy-DHEA
 7β-Hydroxy-DHEA
 7α-Hydroxyepiandrosterone
 7β-Hydroxyepiandrosterone

References

Androstanes
Estrogens
World Anti-Doping Agency prohibited substances